Part of a series of articles upon Archaeology of Kosovo

Pestova archaeological site is a archaeological site located in the village Pestova, in the municipality of Vushtrri, on the left side, stretched along the Pristina-Kosovska Mitrovica road, more or less 4 km from Vushtrri. The area is known for a very fertile agricultural land, productive even in present days.

History 

During the work carried out in 2005 in Pestova, accidentally some wall contours were discovered. Therefore, a rescue excavation was initiated, which resulted with interesting archaeological findings. On this occasion, remains of a building, ruins of a villae rusticae were partially unearthed. The villas are typical Roman houses set in the countryside and far from the urban centres. As a general rule, villa’s are usually one floor house’s, with atrium or central garden.

According to the Roman architecture rules, villas were complex built structures composed of several accompanied rooms, baths or termae and drinkable water deposits. The Pestova villae rusticae had a corridor Villas in the Roman culture apprehend a luxury house; in the towns they are known as villae urbana, whereas in the countryside they are known as villae rustica, and served as resting houses or places for relaxation for the wealthy and powerful Roman families. Villa’s are consisted of master’s house and the Pestova villa most likely belonged to latifondist family, presumably to a very distinguished and rich Furi or Ponti family members from the ancient site of Ulpiana. Parts of villa complex usually are stables for the domestic animals, workshops and storehouses.  When analysing the ancient map Tabvla Imperii Romani, and the site setting of the Pestova villa, it can be argued that most likely, the ancient route that connected Ulpiana with the ancient town of the Municipium DD, passed close or nearby this interesting archaeological site.

See also 
Roman Dardania
Roman cities in Illyria
Archaeology of Kosovo
Neolithic Sites in Kosovo
Roman Period Sites in Kosovo
Late Antiquity and Medieval Sites in Kosovo
Copper, Bronze and Iron Age Sites in Kosovo
Archaeological sites in the District of Mitrovica

References

External links 
 Database of Cultural Heritage of Kosovo

Illyrian Kosovo
Archaeology of Illyria
Dardanians
Moesia
Dardania (Roman province)
Roman towns and cities in Kosovo
Archaeological sites in Kosovo
Cultural heritage monuments in Vushtrri